Kirovsky District is a district of the federal city of St. Petersburg, Russia. As of the 2010 Census, its population was 334,746; down from 338,820 recorded in the 2002 Census.

Municipal divisions
Kirovsky District comprises the following seven municipal okrugs:
Avtovo
Dachnoye
Knyazhevo
Krasnenkaya Rechka
Morskiye Vorota
Narvsky
Ulyanka

References

Notes

Sources

External links
 

 
